Empire Mates State of Mind is a compilation album by musicians of Nigerian record label Empire Mates Entertainment (E.M.E). It was released by the label on 18 June 2012. The album's production was handled by Legendury Beatz, Sarz, Masterkraft, Cobhams Asuquo, Kid Konnect and Spellz. Empire Mates State of Mind features collaborations with X.O Senavoe, Rotimi and Basketmouth. It produced seven singles—"Baddest Boy", "Dance for Me", "Get Down Tonight", "Ko Mo Le", "Sun Mo Mi", "Don't Delay Me (Don't Go There)" and "Change".

Background and recording
Banky W, Wizkid and Skales started recording songs for the album in 2011. Empire Mates State of Mind was initially scheduled for release on 12 June 2012, but ended up being postponed. E.M.E released the album's final track listing instead. On 15 and 16 June, E.M.E organized a listening party and launch to celebrate and promote the album. The listening party was held at the Deuces Bar & Lounge in Victoria Island, Lagos. Most of the songs on the album were recorded at E.M.E headquarters. Banky W told Beverly Bryan of MTV Iggy that living with Skales and Wizkid made the album easier to record.

Spinlet
Empire Mates State of Mind was released exclusively on Spinlet, a digital media company. As a means of promoting the album and its brand, Spinlet gave away 100,000 copies of the album to its subscribers. The album was made available for free digital download to the first 75,000 people who downloaded Spinlet's official mobile application. Nigerian Entertainment Today posted a step by step tutorial on how Spinlet subscribers can download the album.

Singles
The album's lead single "Baddest Boy" was released on 2 April 2012. The song was produced by Legendury Beatz and features contributing vocals by Wizkid, Skales and Banky W. The accompanying music video for "Baddest Boy" was directed by Clarence Peters and uploaded to YouTube on 18 July 2012. The Sarz-produced track "Dance for Me" was released on 25 July 2012, as the album's second single. The visuals for the song was directed by Sesan. The Sarz-produced track "Get Down Tonight" was released as the album's third single. The song's music video was directed by Moe Musa; its release marked the end of E.M.E Wednesdays.

"Ko Mo Le" was released as the album's fourth single. The music video was shot by 1st Impression in Washington DC. The Masterkraft and Banky W-produced track "Sun Mo Mi" was released as the album's fifth single. The Clarence Peters-directed music video for the song features cameo appearances from Wizkid, Niyola, DJ Xclusive, Iyanya, Flowssick, Iceberg Slim and Slim T. The Spellz-produced track "Don't Delay Me (Don't Go There)" was released as the album's sixth single. The visuals for the song features cameo appearances from Lynxxx, Gbenro, Dammy Krane, Skales, Shaydee and DJ Xclusive. "Change" was released as the album's seventh single. The song addresses some of Nigeria's current plights. The music video for "Change" was directed by Clarence Peters.

Critical reception

Empire Mates State of Mind received generally positive reviews from music critics. A writer for TayoTV awarded the album 8.5 stars out of 10, commending the work of each artist. Wilfred Okiche of 360nobs granted the album a rating of 7 out of 10, acknowledging it for being "unabashed in owning up to its motives". Okiche also noted that the album's production "may become repetitive at some point despite the variety of producers involved". Ayomide Tayo of Nigerian Entertainment Today gave the album 3.5 stars out of 5, characterizing it as "one directional at times, with its emphasis on party music". Tayo also opined that all of the artists brought "their own style to each song, saving the project from not being too repetitive." Ogaga Sakapide of TooXclusive gave the album 3 stars out of 5, describing it as "monotonous, tired club-beats and too lengthy". Sakapide acknowledged Wizkid, Niyola and Wellington and further stated that the album is "pretty solid".

Accolades
Empire Mates State of Mind was nominated for Best Album of the Year at the 2013 Nigeria Entertainment Awards.

Track listing

Notes
 "—" denotes a skit

Personnel
Credits adapted from the album's back cover.

 Olubankole Wellington – primary artist, writer, executive producer
 Segun Demuren – executive producer
 Stanley "Tino Bendel" Ekure – A&R, co-executive producer, management
 Tunde Demuren – A&R, co-executive producer
 Ayodeji Balogun – primary artist, writer
 Raoul John Njeng-Njeng – primary artist, writer
 Shadrach Adeboye – primary artist, writer
 Eniola Akinbo – primary artist, writer
 X.O Senavoe – featured artist
 Rotimi – featured artist
 Bright Okpocha – skit performer, writer
 Legendury Beatz – producer
 Sarz – producer
 Masterkraft – producer
 Cohbams Asuquo – producer
 Kid Konnect – producer
 Spellz – producer
 Suka "The Surgeon" Andrew – mix and master engineer
 Anuel Modebe – photography
 Seyi Charles George – photography
 Obi Somto – photography
 Osagie Osarenkhoe – management

Release history

References

2012 compilation albums
Albums produced by Masterkraft (producer)
Banky W. albums
Wizkid albums
Yoruba-language albums
Albums produced by Shizzi
Albums produced by Legendury Beatz
Albums produced by Cobhams Asuquo
Albums produced by Spellz
Albums produced by Kid Konnect
Albums produced by Sarz